Daejeon World Cup Stadium is a football stadium in the South Korean city of Daejeon. It was used to host some matches at the 2002 FIFA World Cup hosted by South Korea and Japan. The stadium displayed a sophisticated structural dynamism, eliminating decorative decoration. Precast Concrete (PC) method considering construction and economical efficiency was used. After the World Cup, the stadium was planned to be a multi-purpose sports park, which has a comprehensive sports center and commercial and cultural facilities in the middle of the region. It is now the home stadium of Daejeon Hana Citizen with a capacity of 40,535 seats, replacing Daejeon Sports Complex.

2002 FIFA World Cup
The stadium was one of the venues of the 2002 FIFA World Cup and held the following matches:

References

Further reading
‘CITIZEN'의 자존심! 대전 월드컵 경기장  - Dream stadium of K-League

External links

World Stadiums

2002 FIFA World Cup stadiums in South Korea
Sport in Daejeon
Daejeon Hana Citizen FC
Buildings and structures in Daejeon
Football venues in South Korea
Sports venues completed in 2001
K League 1 stadiums
K League 2 stadiums